The 1985 Colorado State Rams football team represented Colorado State University in the Western Athletic Conference during the 1985 NCAA Division I-A football season. In their fourth season under head coach Leon Fuller, the Rams compiled a 5–7 record.

Schedule

References

Colorado State
Colorado State Rams football seasons
Colorado State Rams football